SkyGravity is international electronic dance music festival in Ukraine (Crimea, near Evpatoria). Featuring music genres are psytrance, goa, full on, suomi, progressive and break trance, but also ambient, dub, downtempo, idm, electronica, experimental, and reggae.

See also
List of electronic music festivals

References

External links 
SkyGravity Festival Official Website

Music festivals established in 2009
Trance festivals
Electronic music festivals in Ukraine
2009 establishments in Ukraine